Dacryodes costata is a tree in the family Burseraceae. The specific epithet  is from the Latin meaning "ribbed", likely referring to the prominent veins on the leaf underside.

Description
The grey-brown bark is smooth to flaky. The flowers are white.

Distribution and habitat
Dacryodes costata grows naturally in Sumatra, Peninsular Malaysia, Singapore, Borneo and the Philippines. Its habitat is lowland and hill forests from sea-level to  altitude.

References

costata
Trees of Malesia
Plants described in 1932
Taxa named by Alfred William Bennett
Taxa named by Herman Johannes Lam